John Zundel (10 December 1815 – 21 May 1882) was an organist, composer, arranger, and pedagogue.  Zundel was perhaps best known for his hymn BEECHER, widely used in American hymnals with "Love Divine" by Charles Wesley.

Early life
Zundel was born in the village of Hochdorf an der Enz (now part of Eberdingen) in what was then the Kingdom of Württemberg, Germany. He attended the Royal Academy at Esslingen, Württemberg, from 1829 to 1831, then he began teaching at the local school in Birkach, Germany. In 1833 he was appointed teacher of music in Esslingen. During this time, Zundel studied the violin with a pupil of Bernhard Molique. Also he studied the organ first with J.G. French and then with Heinrich Rinck.

St. Petersburg, Russia
In 1839 Zundel studied organ building at the factory of Eberhard Friedrich Walcker, and in 1840 he travelled to St. Petersburg, Russia, to give a concert on a Walcker organ at the Lutheran Church of Saint Peter and Saint Paul. It was the first organ concert ever given on Russian soil. Zundel became organist at Saint Anne Lutheran Church in Saint Petersburg and bandmaster of the Imperial House Guards. He remained in St. Petersburg for seven years.

Plymouth Church in New York
Intending to give organ concerts, Zundel emigrated to the United States in 1847. Unable to find suitable instruments for concerts, he settled in as a church organist. Employed first at the Unitarian Church of Brooklyn under Reverend Farnley in 1848, he was then hired by Henry Ward Beecher in 1850 as music director and organist for Brooklyn's Plymouth Church. Zundel remained at Plymouth Church a total of 28 years, interrupted twice to travel and to serve briefly in nearby churches.

Compositions

Zundel's lasting contributions to music pedagogy were his instructional texts, principally Zundel's Harmony. His work spanned over 20 years.

The Choral Friend, A Collection of New Church Music, consisting of Original Anthems and Psalms and Hymn Tunes; Adapted to the Most Common Metres. New York: A.S. Barnes & Co. 1852.
 Zundel's Melodeon Instructor, 1853
 The Amateur Organist, 1854
 Plymouth Collection of Hymns, 1855 (edited with Beecher) 
 Psalmody, 1855 (editor)
 Modern Organ-School (Boston, Massachusetts: 1860)
 Treatise on Harmony and Modulation, 1862
 Christian Heart Songs, 1870
 School Harmonist (with James E. Ryan) (New York: American Book Company, 1873)

Additionally, Zundel composed a number of preludes, postludes, voluntaries, and fantasies suitable for church services.

Zundel returned to his native country before his death in Kirchheim unter Teck, Germany, in May 1882.

References

External links
 
 History of Plymouth Church (Henry Ward Beecher) 1847 to 1872 See chapter nine, page 137

1815 births
1882 deaths
People from Ludwigsburg (district)
People from the Kingdom of Württemberg
German emigrants to the United States
American classical organists
American male organists
American male composers
Musicians from Baden-Württemberg
Musicians from New York City
19th-century American composers
Classical musicians from New York (state)
19th-century male musicians
19th-century musicians
Male classical organists
19th-century organists